Sweet Rosie O'Grady is a 1943 Technicolor musical film about an American singer who attempts to better herself by marrying an English duke, but is harassed by a reporter. Directed by Irving Cummings, it stars Betty Grable and Robert Young.

Cast

 Betty Grable as Madeleine Marlowe / Rosie O'Grady
 Robert Young as Sam Magee
 Adolphe Menjou as Thomas Moran
 Reginald Gardiner as Charles, Duke of Trippingham
 Virginia Grey as Edna Van Dyke
 Phil Regan as Mr. Clark
 Sig Ruman as Joe Flugelman
 Alan Dinehart as Arthur Skinner
 Hobart Cavanaugh as Clark
 Frank Orth as Taxi Driver
 Jonathan Hale as Mr. Fox
 George Cockerill as Singer

Box office
Betty Grable was the number one box-office attraction at the time of this film's release. Her other film that year was Coney Island, and this movie was also an enormous success. Both Coney Island and Sweet Rosie O'Grady were among the top 10 high-grossing films of 1943 and were two of 20th Century Fox's big money makers that year.

References

External links

1943 films
1943 musical comedy films
1943 romantic comedy films
American musical comedy films
American romantic comedy films
American romantic musical films
1940s English-language films
Films directed by Irving Cummings
20th Century Fox films
Films scored by Leigh Harline
1940s romantic musical films
Films produced by William Perlberg
1940s American films